Scanner may refer to:

Technology

For invisible radiation 
 Scanner (radio),  for searching for and receiving radio broadcasts
 An outside broadcasting control vehicle
 A rotating radar antenna
 Neutron scanner,  a scanner which utilizes neutrons to penetrate objects for analysis

For (near) light 
 Image scanner,  which digitizes a two-dimensional image
 3D scanner,  which digitizes the three-dimensional shape of a real object
 Motion picture film scanner, which scans original film for storage as a digital file
 Barcode reader,  which reads the data encoded in a barcode
 Laser scanner, which guides a laser beam along a path, sometimes combined with a measurement
 Stepper,  a part of the photolithography process
 A biometric scanner,  an electronic device with a sensor to read patterns or images from faces, irises, and finger pads to create a biological template or profile
 An automated spotlight

Computer software 
 Port scanner,  in computer networking
 Virus scanner
 Vulnerability scanner,  a computer program that probes for weaknesses
 Lexical analyzer, a computer program
 WikiScanner, a tool that provided a searchable database of anonymous Wikipedia edits
 Scanner, a disk space analyzing and management tool for Microsoft Windows
 Image scanner, a device to digitize paper documents

Medical
 MRI scanner
 CT scanner

Other 
 An automotive electronic control unit diagnostic tool

Popular culture
 Scanner (band), a German speed metal band
 Scanners (band), an alternative band from London
 Scanner, the stage name of British electronic musician Robin Rimbaud
 Scanner (Code Lyoko), a fictional teleportation device
 Scanner (Half-Life), a floating enemy in the Half-Life video game series
 Scanners, a 1981 science fiction horror film
 "Scanners" (Superstore), an episode of the television series Superstore

See also
Scan (disambiguation)